, often written as Lei Fang, is a player character in the Dead or Alive fighting game series by Team Ninja and Tecmo (Koei Tecmo). She was introduced in the original Dead or Alive in 1996 and has appeared in the series' subsequent installments. She is a Chinese college student and Tai Chi martial arts prodigy who competes in the Dead or Alive tournaments to prove her superiority over fellow combatant Jann Lee.

One of the Dead or Alive series' more popular characters, Leifang has appeared on series merchandise and the feature film DOA: Dead or Alive. She has received mainly positive public and critical reception for factors such as her sex appeal and in-game costumes.

Appearances

In video games
Leifang is a college student born into a wealthy family. She was officially aged nineteen prior to the two-year timeline skip in Dead or Alive 5. Leifang is depicted in the games as a personable woman of justice and bearing an independent spirit, and hopes that by honing her own martial arts skills, she can inspire others to do the same.  Her youth and general life inexperience sometimes causes her to act impulsively.

In the storyline of the original game, she was saved from a gang of street fighters by martial artist Jann Lee. Rather than being thankful, she instead becomes obsessed over defeating Jann Lee in battle, as she is bitter over his intervention because she believes she was capable at the time of saving herself. However, she loses to him in subsequent DOA tournaments except that of Dead or Alive 4. She has a close friend in karate master Hitomi, and since Dead or Alive 2 she has formed a friendly rivalry with wrestler Tina Armstrong, who believes that the meaning of power comes from physical strength.

Design and gameplay

In the early sketches for the original Dead or Alive, Leifang's name was Long Lihua (龍麗華) and her fighting style was Chinese kung fu (中国拳法). Leifang is 163 cm high, weights 50 kg, and her measurements are B87/W55/H86. She is known for cheongsam gowns  and her signature braided queue hairstyle, but has also sported a variety of many other costumes and hairstyles (and hair colors) through the series. Leifang's wardrobe in Dead or Alive 5 Last Round includes downloadable costumes of Telma from Deception IV: The Nightmare Princess, Estelle Bright from The Legend of Heroes: Trails in the Sky, Hotaru Sakamiya from School Girl Strikers, and Junko from Time Bokan, as well as many others including ninja and superhero outfits.  Leifang's Japanese voice actress has always been Yumi Tōma, who also voiced a similarly genki Chinese girl fighter Ling Xiaoyu in the Tekken series.

Saturn Power judged Leifang as one of the first game's better characters due to her "great counters and lightning speed". According to IGN's Hillary Goldstein, Leifang "has some of the best counters in DOA Ultimate, which helps since she isn't exactly a master of combos." She was vastly improved by the developers for Dead or Alive 5, for which she was given a more advanced ability to parry opponents' attacks. According to Anthony Chau of IGN, "Her elegant moves hide powerful attacks and while she's not the greatest in combination department, she's never been a combo-intensive character like Zack or Kasumi. Lei Fang's strength lies in high-priority moves and proficiency in countering." Developer Koei Tecmo offered Leifang as an additional free playable character in the "Core Fighters" version of DOA5LR to Japanese customers from August to September 2015, in celebration of the game reaching four million downloads.

Other appearances
Stuntwoman Ying Wang played Leifang in a minor role in the live-action film DOA: Dead or Alive. The character makes several appearances at the beginning of the film, until she is knocked out by Gen Fu.

In the 2002 film One Hour Photo, the son Jake Yorkin (portrayed by Dylan Smith) is playing Dead or Alive 2 Hardcore in his bedroom, and on the television screen is Leifang and Jann Lee fighting in the Aerial Gardens stage.

Several figures of Leifang were released by Bandai, Epoch, and other companies like After Dark and Kotobukiya. Other merchandise has included dakimakura body pillow cases and 3D mouse pads.

Reception

The character has received mainly positive reception by gaming media. Dreamcast Magazine described Leifang as "a Chinese beauty in all senses of the word...as well as proving to be a bit of a femme fatale at the same time", while she was "an elegant fighter if ever there was one." Computer and Video Games and Sega Saturn Magazine both compared Leifang to Virtua Fighter character Pai Chan, with the latter also holding her, Tina and Kasumi in the same class as Lara Croft. Saturn Power opined that while most of "the DOA competitors seem either insipid or a mite too similar to Virtua Fighter stalwarts for comfor," Lei-Fang and Jann Lee "are okay." PSX Magazine chose Leifang as the character most fun to play as in the first game. Sina Corp stated that no fighting game fan would not recognise Leifang's dresses, while Kotaku's Brian Ashcraft called her "everyone's favorite supreme ultimate fist college student." Leifang was voted the Dead or Alive series' ninth-most popular female character in a fan poll held by Koei Tecmo in 2014 and 2015. She almost qualified for Dead or Alive Xtreme 3, but in the end was barely beaten by Helena Douglas in an Asian popularity poll. She was, however, eventually included via an update in the game's PC version, Dead or Alive Xtreme Venus Vacation. A poll for the most erotic girl in the history of fighting games conducted by Japanese web portal Goo had Leifang and Tina share the 17th/18th place (out of 50 contesters) in 2016.

GameDaily featured the "beautiful yet deadly" Leifang as their "Babe of the Week" on multiple occasions, and as one of their "bikini babes". Leifang joined fellow DOA characters Kasumi, Ayane, and Hitomi in a four-way tie for tenth on the Spanish edition of IGN's 2011 selection of "video game hotties". Maxim chose her as one of the top nine "video game vixens" in 2009. China's NetEase included her among the 21 "game goddesses" in 2012. In their 2013 selection of the "greatest boobs in gaming history", GameFront ranked Leifang thirteenth. Steve Jenkins of CheatCodes.com ranked her as the 16th hottest "video game girl" of all time that same year. In 2015, Indonesian television Liputan 6 placed Leifang fifth on their list of sexiest Oriental women in video games, while Vietnamese daily Thanh Niên ranked her as the 16th most sexy female video game character in general. In "Xbox High Yearbook 2003", Official Xbox Magazine chose Leifang and Hitomi as a couple "most likely to have a 'college experience'." Complex rated her Dead or Alive: Dimensions victory quote ("No matter how much you try, you still won't beat me") among their 2012 selection of a hundred "most humiliating" video game quotes.

See also
List of Dead or Alive characters

Explanatory notes

References

External links
  (Dead or Alive 5)

Dead or Alive (franchise) characters
Female characters in video games
Fictional Chinese people in video games
Fictional martial artists in video games
Fictional tai chi practitioners
Fictional female martial artists
Koei Tecmo protagonists
Video game characters introduced in 1996
Woman soldier and warrior characters in video games